Order of Honour is a state order of the Republic of Moldova established by Parliament of Moldova in 2002, which is awarded by presidential decree. It is the fourth highest distinction of Moldova, after Order of the Republic, Order of Ştefan cel Mare, Order of Bogdan the Founder (Ordinul Bogdan Întemeietorul), and just before the Order of Loyalty to the Homeland (Ordinul Credinţa Patriei). The Order of Honour can be awarded also to organizations, institutions, etc.

Notable individual recipients (partial list)

 Sepp Blatter
 Michel Platini
 Borys Paton
 Radosław Sikorski
 Serafim Urechean
 Pavel Cebanu
 Titus Corlățean
 Raed Arafat
 Mitrofan Cioban
 Zinaida Greceanîi
 Vasile Sturza
 Ion Negrei
 Alexandru Tănase
 Vladimir Hotineanu
 Valeriu Cosarciuc
 Leonid Bujor
 Alexandru Oleinic
 Valentina Buliga
 Marcel Răducan
 Veaceslav Iordan
 Dumitru Diacov
 Vasile Ursu
 Vadim Cojocaru
 Oleg Bodrug
 Veaceslav Untilă
 Ion Pleșca
 Iurie Colesnic
 Anatolie Ghilaș
 Nicolae Dabija (politician)
 Vasile Șoimaru
 Tudor Gheorghe Țopa
 Mihai Poiată
 Vasile Vatamanu
 Alecu Reniță
 Ion Ungureanu
 Victor Stepaniuc
 Nicolae Țâu
 Gheorghe Amihalachioaie
 Peter (Păduraru)
 Victor Pușcaș
 Marius Lazurca
 Dan Dungaciu
 Ion Țurcanu
 Mihail Dolgan
 Dirk Schuebel
 Cesare de Montis
 Mihai Balan
 Vitalie Ciobanu
 Academy of Economic Studies of Moldova
 Nichita Smochină
 Grigore Belostecinic
 Emilian Galaicu-Păun
 Vasile Bumacov
 Andrei Usatîi
 Tatiana Anodina
 Nicolae Andronic
 Gheorghe Buzatu
 Marchel (Mihăescu)
 Peter (Musteață)
 Andrian Candu
 Ion Anton
 Valeriu Rudic
 Ionel Haiduc
 Irina Loghin
Péter Szijjártó
SunStroke Project

Collective awardees

 Theoretical Lyceum George Asaki (Chisinau) (2010)
 Theoretical Lyceum of Mikhail Berezovsky (Chisinau) (2010) 
 Ion Creanga Theoretical Lyceum (Chisinau) (2010) 
 Theoretical Lyceum of Mihai Eminescu (Chisinau) (2010) 
 Theoretical Lyceum Spiru Hareta (Chisinau) (2010)
 Theoretical Lyceum of Mihai the Brave (Chisinau) (2010)
 Academy of Economic Education of Moldova (2011)
 Theoretical Lyceum of Saints Cyril and Methodius (Chisinau) (2011) 
 State Enterprise "Security Service" of the Ministry of Internal Affairs of the Republic of Moldova (2012) 
 Theoretical Lyceum of Mihai Eminescu (Balti) (2013) 
 Republican Theoretical Lyceum I. Creanga (Balti) (2016) 
 Department of Carabinieri Troops of the Ministry of Internal Affairs of the Republic of Moldova (2017) 
 Academy of Public Administration (2018)
 Gymnasium named after N.V. Gogol of the city of Bessarabka (2019)
 National Museum of Ethnography and Natural History (2019)
 National Children's Library. Iona Creangă (2019)
 City Clinical Hospital "St. Michael the Archangel" (Chisinau, 2019)
 Peace Corps

References

Honour
Awards established in 2002
2002 establishments in Moldova